Saint Cybard (or Eparchius, Eparque, Ybar, Ybard, Separchius, Cybar; 504 – 1 July 581) was a monk and a hermit who inhabited a cave beneath the walls of Angoulême for forty-four years. The Latin form of his name is Eparchius, and it also appears in French as Éparche and Ybars, as in the commune of Saint-Ybars.

Life

Cybard was probably born at Trémolat in the Périgord. He was ordained a priest by Aptonius III, the Bishop of Angoulême, in 542. His story is told in Gregory of Tours Historia Francorum (VI, 8). An anonymous hagiography entitled Vita et virtutes Eparchii reclusi Ecolismensis ("The life and virtues of Eparchius the recluse of Angoulême") tells how "alone he ... walked by night to the spot where he should be a recluse. Having finished his journey and his prayers, he lay down his head on a rock." That spot was, according to the same source, at "a remote location, far from the city, and from above on the side of the mountain trickled a stream of flowing water, and the river Charente started out from there."

The Abbey of Saint-Cybard was built over Cybard's cave after his death, a church in La Rochefoucauld is dedicated to him, and a quarter of Angoulême bears his name. He is the patron saint of the diocese and his feast day is 1 July.

Butler's account

The hagiographer Alban Butler wrote in his Lives of the Primitive Fathers, Martyrs, and Other Principal Saints, under July 1:

Citations

Sources
*

Further reading
Saint-Roche, P. (1985). "A propos du sanctoral du sacramentaire d'Angoulême." Rivista di archeologia cristiana 61 (1–2): 113–18.

6th-century Frankish saints